Steven Allen Rosenberg (born October 31, 1964) is an American former Major League Baseball left-handed pitcher who played for the Chicago White Sox and San Diego Padres from 1988 to 1991.

Early years
Rosenberg was born and raised in Brooklyn, New York, and grew up in Coral Springs, Florida. He played football, basketball and baseball at Coral Springs High School, and played baseball at Broward Community College for two years before transferring to the University of Florida as a junior. After the 1985 season, he played collegiate summer baseball with the Falmouth Commodores of the Cape Cod Baseball League and was named a league all-star. As a senior, he tied a team record by pitching ten complete games in the postseason. After which, he was drafted by his hometown New York Yankees in the fourth round of the 1986 Major League Baseball draft.

He went 14-6 with a 2.84 earned run average in two seasons in the Yankees' farm system when he was packaged with Dan Pasqua and Mark Salas, and sent to the Chicago White Sox for pitchers Richard Dotson & Scott Nielsen on November 12, .

Chicago White Sox
He was 2-0 with three saves & a 3.33 ERA for the Pacific Coast League's Vancouver Canadians in  when he got the call to the majors. He made his major league debut on June 4, and was hit hard by the Texas Rangers. In two innings, he gave up three runs on four hits and a walk. He earned the only save of his career on August 17 against the Toronto Blue Jays, and lost his only decision of the season in extra innings to the Minnesota Twins on September 10.

He earned his first major league win on May 14, 1989, against the Baltimore Orioles. He lost to Baltimore eight days later in his first major league start. He remained in the rotation for the rest of the season, earning his first win as a starting pitcher on June 12 against the Cleveland Indians. He beat his former franchise on July 17 to improve to 3-5 with a 4.48 ERA, however, Rosenberg had a rough second half to his season. Over the rest of the season, he was 1-8 with a 5.66 ERA. Opposing batters hit .296 against him.

He was called up to the Chisox that September, and went 1-0 with a 5.40 ERA.

San Diego Padres
During Spring training , Rosenberg and Adam Peterson were traded to the San Diego Padres for Joey Cora, Warren Newson and minor leaguer Kevin Garner. He started the season in triple A with the Las Vegas Stars, but was up in the majors by early May when pitcher Pat Clements was placed on the fifteen day disabled list. He went 1-1 with a 6.94 ERA before being demoted back down to Las Vegas.

After the season, he was dealt to the New York Mets for infielder Jeff Gardner. but arm issues kept him off the field for all of the  season. He never appeared in a game for the Mets at any level. In , he appeared in six games with the Seattle Mariners' California League affiliate, the Riverside Pilots, before retiring.

Personal life
Rosenberg is Jewish. He and his wife, Cristine, have four children: Dante, Chelsea, Nicole & Keri. Dante spent two seasons as a catcher in the St. Louis Cardinals organization.

See also 

Florida Gators
List of Florida Gators baseball players
List of Jews in sports

References

External links

1964 births
Living people
Albany-Colonie Yankees players
American expatriate baseball players in Canada
Baseball players from New York (state)
Chicago White Sox players
Columbus Clippers players
Falmouth Commodores players
Florida Gators baseball players
Fort Lauderdale Yankees players
Jewish American baseball players
Jewish Major League Baseball players
Las Vegas Stars (baseball) players
Major League Baseball pitchers
Oneonta Yankees players
Riverside Pilots players
San Diego Padres players
Sportspeople from Brooklyn
Baseball players from New York City
Broward Seahawks baseball players
Vancouver Canadians players
Broward College alumni
21st-century American Jews